Jaan Sarv (21 December 1877 – 23 August 1954) was an Estonian mathematician and educator. Most of his life he worked as a professor at the University of Tartu. Sarv laid the foundation of Estonian language mathematical education.

References

"Eesti koolimatemaatika ajalugu" I-IV, Olaf Prinits, Tartu, 1992–1994 

1877 births
1954 deaths
People from Rõuge Parish
People from the Governorate of Livonia
Estonian mathematicians
Hugo Treffner Gymnasium alumni
University of Tartu alumni
Academic staff of the University of Tartu
Recipients of the Order of the White Star, 3rd Class